David (Dave) Braine held the position of an athletics director at Georgia Tech from 1997 to 2006 and Virginia Tech from 1988 to 1997. Braine significantly improved the athletic programs at both schools and increased the support of student athletes with more focus on academics and life skills.

Early life and education
David Braine is a native of Grove City, Pennsylvania. He earned a Master's of arts and teaching from the University of North Carolina in 1966. Braine also played football for the Tar Heels during 1962–1964 seasons as place kicker and defensive back.

Career
Braine is noted for serving as athletic director for both Georgia Tech and Virginia Tech. However, Braine's administrative career also included two years as athletics director at Marshall University and assistant positions at Fresno State and Virginia. Braine previously spent two years at Georgia Tech as an assistant football coach under Pepper Rodgers, and he also coached at Virginia, Richmond and Virginia Military Institute.

Virginia Tech
When Braine became athletic director of Virginia Tech in 1988, he inherited a program that was plagued with financial, academic, and NCAA compliance problems. However, Virginia Tech made progress both on and off the playing field during this time frame. Braine emphasized improving the quality of student life through increased academic advisement and by implementing a code of conduct for student-athletes. Virginia Tech's graduation rate for student-athletes increased to 70 percent, which was 12 percent above the national average for Division I schools. Braine also directed an expansion of women's athletics that made Virginia Tech compliant with federal gender-equity rules by implementing new women's sports programs, such as soccer, lacrosse, and softball. During Braine's tenure, Virginia Tech won an NIT Championship in basketball and nine Atlantic 10 Conference titles in other sports. Braine also oversaw significant improvement in Virginia Tech's athletics facilities.

Braine helped rebuild Virginia Tech football program by securing ties with the Big East Conference and by supporting Virginia Tech's football coach Frank Beamer following a 2-8-1 football season in 1992. Braine lead the Hokies to back-to-back berths in the Sugar Bowl and Orange Bowl. During the past two decades, Virginia Tech football program has been successful with Beamer as head football coach as measured by the number of winning seasons and bowl appearances. For his contributions in Blacksburg, he was enshrined in the Virginia Tech Sports Hall of Fame.

Georgia Tech
Braine became athletic director at Georgia Tech on June 3, 1997. Athletic highlights during Braine's tenure at Georgia Tech include the men's basketball team's 2004 NCAA runner-up finish and a school-record streak of nine straight bowl games for the football program. Other athletics highlights during Braine's tenure at Georgia Tech include No. 1 national rankings in baseball and golf, and 12 ACC team titles in seven different sports.

Facility upgrades completed during Braine's tenure at Georgia Tech include the $75 million renovation and expansion of Bobby Dodd Stadium at Historic Grant Field, the reconstruction of Russ Chandler Baseball Stadium and the new Georgia Tech Aquatic Center, which hosted the 2006 NCAA Swimming Championships.

As Athletic Director, Braine emphasized the Total Person Concept, a comprehensive support program that stresses academics and life skills. Through the Total Person Program, Georgia Tech student-athletes benefit from a number of enrichment programs ranging from life skills and career planning to wellness and community outreach. During Braine's tenure, the Homer Rice Center for Sports Performance was created. The Center's efforts concentrate on performance enhancement for student-athletes participating in the sports programs of the Georgia Tech Athletic Association with services also available for Tech students, faculty and staff. 
The center offers a motion analysis lab, a medical clinic and psychology lab, a nutrition center and a sports vision center. Also during Braine's tenure, Georgia Tech was named the recipient of the first-ever Atlantic Coast Conference Sportsmanship School of the Year Award in 2004.

Braine retired in 2006 due to health concerns after he was diagnosed with Crohn's disease.

References

Living people
1943 births
Georgia Tech Yellow Jackets athletic directors
Marshall Thundering Herd athletic directors
North Carolina Tar Heels football players
Virginia Tech Hokies athletic directors
People from Grove City, Pennsylvania
Players of American football from Pennsylvania